Chal Pichchur Banate Hain is a Hindi family comic drama film, the debut film of writer and director Pritish Chakraborty. The film was released all over on 7 September 2012. The film explores themes like rampant copy paste in the film industry, the lack of originality in ideas, the prevailing star system alongside the unending passion of a true cinema lover through the journey of a young MBA who quits everything and goes against everyone in order to pursue his dream of becoming a filmmaker.  The film was written and directed by Chakraborty, music is by Gaurav Dagaonkar, cinematography is by Hari Nair while the film is edited by debutante editor Amardeep Singh Khichi.

Plot
Suraj has everything any young man would kill for – an MBA, a well-paid job and an offer from UK with a salary of 5,000 pounds.
But Suraj is no ordinary boy! He has only one passion – Cinema. His only dream is to be a film Producer-Director. He chooses passion over money and becomes a rebel. He produces a shocker to his family and friends, that he is quitting his job to follow his dream of film making. Being disowned by everyone and without any industry contacts, Suraj is left all alone to find his way in the big bad world of Bollywood.

Suraj starts his career by putting posters alongside roads. He struggles as an assistant on the sets and has to face rejection from the industry, his friends, family and loved ones.

Chal Pichchur Banate Hain is Suraj's passionate journey from an MBA to a filmmaker.

Cast
 Rahil Tandon as Suraj Kumar has one dream; he wants to become a film director-producer. He has been obsessed with films since childhood and he is willing to give up his MBA career in order to fulfill his dream. His parents, like in most cases are against it and even his friends regard him as a fool to think of giving up a stable job and salary for the film industry where he has no knowledge or experience. He only has one thing – PASSION
 Bhavna Ruparel as Melrena is the girl next door. She is beautiful, lively and becomes Suraj's greatest strength.
 Sandeep Sachdev as Sadiq Khan is classy and cocky. He is the actor who everybody wants to make films with and everybody wants to be around. Sadiq however, is not all talk – and all he really wants to do is be someone more than just a star in a baseless film. He wants to be seen doing meaningful films.
 Denesh Pandey as Sameer Kumar is Suraj's father and since childhood has groomed Suraj to take up a serious career. In order for Suraj to have a settled life, he has encouraged him to do his MBA. He is fed-up of his son's non-chalant attitude towards his job and wants him to give up all ambitions of being a filmmaker.
 Smita Hai as Amrita Kumar is Suraj's mother. Like any other typical Indian mother, Amrita wants her son to be free of evils and bad thoughts. She is the mother who strongly believes in astrology, also consulting a Pandit to remove all thoughts of pursuing a 'film career' from her son's mind. Amrita is beautiful and loud. She speaks her mind out and is what every mother is – protective.
 Errol Peter Marks as Nikhil is Suraj's childhood friend. His sister was to wed Suraj, before Suraj shocks his friends and family and plans to work on films.
Sheikh Arif as Shakti is an audience pleaser and a money launderer. He is ambitious and liked by all. He is also someone who at first glance comes across as a trouble maker.
Vipul Bhatt as Ramani is a strong powerful man, who initially is a family friend, but later turns around to be the 'bad guy'.
Shahnawaz Pradhan as Irani is a very straightforward biggie in the film industry. He is extremely upfront and lets newcomers know what he wants. Irani is like every top director-producer who does not give newcomers a break in the filmy parivaar.
 Mukesh Bhatt as Mansoor has a callous attitude of his own. He works for film producers with young boys, hiring them for a job that includes putting up posters alongside roads.
Pankaj Kalra as Khanna is a 'know it all-have it all' Bollywood Biggie. Khanna is a smart film Director and Producer who knows exactly what he wants.
 Reecha Sinha as Sadhna is Suraj's younger but more matured sister. Sadhna's primary focus is the well-being of her family which includes her parents and her cinema crazy brother, Suraj.
 Vandita Shrivastava as News Reporter

Music
"Baanwra Mann" - Sunidhi Chauhan, Shaan
"Bas Tu Hi" - Javed Ali, Shreya Ghoshal
"Copy Paste" - Kailash Kher
"Its Time" - Suraj Jagan
"Main Gaa Loon Zara" - Gaurav Dagaonkar

Critical reception
Martin D'Souza, of Yahoo gave the film a rating of 2.5/5, complimenting the idea behind film and how it was presented but felt the film added a subplot after what he felt should have been the climax that was detrimental to the overall film.

References

External links
 Chal Pichchur Banate Hain at IMDb

 

2010s Hindi-language films
2012 films
2010s musical comedy-drama films
2012 romantic comedy-drama films
2010s satirical films
Indian musical comedy-drama films
Indian romantic comedy-drama films
Indian satirical films
Films shot in Goa
Films shot in Mumbai